Barry Wilson was the coach of the PNG Kumuls Team in 1986 during which they defeated the New Zealand 24-22 on 17 Aug 1986 in Port Moresby.

References

Papua New Guinea national rugby league team coaches
Possibly living people
Year of birth missing
Place of birth missing
Nationality missing